Hara jerdoni, common name in English Sylhet Hara; also known as Asian Stone Catfish, or Dwarf Anchor Catfish, is a species of South Asian river catfish native to northeastern India and Bangladesh. This species grows to a length of  TL.  It is sometimes seen in the aquarium trade.

References

Erethistidae
Fish of Bangladesh
Freshwater fish of India
Fish described in 1870
Taxa named by Francis Day